Gou Zhongwen (born 26 June 1957) is a Chinese politician who served as director of the State General Administration of Sports from 2016 to 2022.

Biography 
Gou was born Zhenyuan County, Gansu province. He joined the Chinese Communist Party in April 1976, the year Mao died. He attended Xidian University with a degree in electrical engineering. He also has a Master's of Business Administration (MBA).

In February 2002, Gou was named Vice Minister of Information Technology. He was transferred to become a vice mayor of Beijing in April 2008.

He became a member of the Beijing party standing committee in July 2013, taking charge of the Zhongguancun administrative district a month later, in addition to overseeing education in the city. In May 2016, he replaced the disgraced Lü Xiwen as deputy party chief of the Chinese capital.

In October 2016, Gou became Director of the State General Administration of Sports.  On December 28, 2016, he was elected as the President of the Chinese Olympic Committee. He is currently the Executive President of the Beijing Organising Committee for the 2022 Olympic and Paralympic Winter Games.

In 2019, he was elected as the new president of the International Wushu Federation.

He was awarded the Silver Olympic Order after the 2022 Winter Olympics.

References

External links
Gou Zhongwen's official CV

1957 births
Living people
People from Qingyang
Xidian University alumni
Zhongguancun
Deputy mayors of Beijing
Recipients of the Olympic Order
People's Republic of China politicians from Gansu
Chinese Communist Party politicians from Gansu